

Plants

Ferns

Arthropods

Insects

Ichthyosauromorpha

Ichthyosaurs

Archosauromorphs

Newly named non-avian dinosaurs

Synapsids

"Pelycosaurians"

See also

References

1870s in paleontology
Paleontology, 1879 In